The 2018 Ladies Open Lugano (also known as the 2018 Samsung Open presented by Cornèr for sponsorship reasons) was a women's tennis tournament played on clay courts at TC Lido Lugano. It was the second edition of the tournament (the first to take place in Lugano) and part of the International category of the 2018 WTA Tour. It took place between 9 April through 15 April 2018.

Points and prize money

Point distribution

Prize money

Singles main draw entrants

Seeds

 1 Rankings are as of 2 April 2018.

Other entrants
The following players received wildcards into the main draw:
 Svetlana Kuznetsova
 Jil Teichmann
 Stefanie Vögele

The following players received entry using a protected ranking into the main draw:
 Mandy Minella

The following players received entry from the qualifying draw:
 Alexandra Cadanțu
 Kathinka von Deichmann
 Richèl Hogenkamp
 Tamara Korpatsch
 Danka Kovinić
 Vera Lapko

The following player received entry as a lucky loser:
 Magdalena Fręch

Withdrawals
Before the tournament
  Timea Bacsinszky → replaced by  Polona Hercog
  Kiki Bertens → replaced by  Mandy Minella
  Dominika Cibulková → replaced by  Kristýna Plíšková
  Sorana Cîrstea → replaced by  Hsieh Su-wei
  Anna-Lena Friedsam → replaced by  Yulia Putintseva
  Kateryna Kozlova → replaced by  Laura Siegemund
  Maria Sakkari → replaced by  Kirsten Flipkens
  Carla Suárez Navarro → replaced by  Magdalena Fręch

Retirements
  Kristina Mladenovic
  Laura Siegemund

Doubles main draw entrants

Seeds

1 Rankings are as of 2 April 2018.

Other entrants
The following pair received a wildcard into the main draw:
  Amandine Hesse /  Kristina Mladenovic

The following pair received entry as alternates:
  Réka-Luca Jani /  Danka Kovinić

Withdrawals
Before the tournament
  Kristina Mladenovic

Champions

Singles 

  Elise Mertens def.  Aryna Sabalenka, 7–5, 6–2

Doubles 

  Kirsten Flipkens /  Elise Mertens def.  Vera Lapko /  Aryna Sabalenka, 6–1, 6–3

References

External links 
 

Ladies Open Lugano
Ladies Open Lugano
Ladies Open Lugano
2018 in Swiss tennis